The Damned are an English punk rock band from London. Formed in June 1976, the group originally consisted of vocalist Dave Vanian, guitarist Brian James, bassist Raymond "Captain Sensible" Burns and drummer Christopher "Rat Scabies" Millar. The band's current lineup includes Vanian, Sensible (on guitar; from 1976 to 1984, 1988 to 1992, and since 1996), bassist Paul Gray (from 1980 to 1983, 1989 to 1992, in 1996, and since 2017) keyboardist Laurence "Monty Oxymoron" Burrow (since 1996) and drummer Will Taylor (since early February 2022).

History

1976–1989
The Damned were formed by Dave Vanian, Brian James, Captain Sensible and Rat Scabies in June 1976. After the release of their debut album Damned Damned Damned, Robert "Lu" Edmonds was added as a second guitarist in August 1977. This lineup recorded Music for Pleasure, although Scabies had left the band by the time it was released. After a handful of shows with temporary substitute Dave Berk, the band replaced Scabies for a European tour the following month with Jon Moss. Music for Pleasure was a commercial failure, which led to the Damned being dropped by their label Stiff Records and breaking up in early 1978. In the following months, Vanian, Sensible (on guitar) and Scabies performed a handful of shows initially as Les Punks, with Motörhead frontman Lemmy filling in on bass at the Electric Ballroom, Camden on 5/9/1978 , then as The Doomed with Henry Badowski.

In January 1979, the Damned officially reformed with Alasdair "Algy" Ward (formerly of Australian band the Saints) taking over the vacated bass role. Machine Gun Etiquette was issued later in the year, before Ward was replaced by Paul Gray in early 1980. After the release of The Black Album, the band added Paul Scott as their first live keyboardist. He was replaced in July 1981 by Pete Saunders, who subsequently made way for Roman Jugg in November, after Saunders's initially chosen replacement Tosh was unable to join. As a five-piece lineup for the first time, the group issued Friday 13th in 1981, Strawberries in 1982, and Live at Newcastle in 1983. In March 1983, however, Gray left to join UFO, with Bryn Merrick (a former bandmate of Jugg's in the group Victimize) taking his place.

Before a show on 24 August 1984, Captain Sensible left the Damned to focus on his solo career, with Jugg taking over as lead guitarist and Steve McGuire of Doctor and the Medics temporarily filling in on keyboards. The group subsequently continued as a four-piece, with the addition of Paul "Shirley" Shepley as touring keyboardist. After the release of Phantasmagoria and Anything, the Damned were dropped by MCA Records. The band continued performing live, before the original quartet reformed for part of a special show in June 1988 which was later issued as Final Damnation. Sensible and James continued to tour with the existing lineup (with Gray in place of Bryn), performing select songs at shows during 1989. After a final farewell tour in the UK and US, the group disbanded later in the year.

1991 onwards
The Damned's breakup was short-lived, however, as they embarked on a reunion tour just two years later. After a few shows into the September 1991 run, Brian James left the band suddenly following an argument with Captain Sensible and Rat Scabies, and the remaining members continued as a four-piece. The Damned essentially disbanded again after a short run of European shows in 1992, before Dave Vanian and Scabies introduced a new incarnation of the group in December 1993 featuring guitarists Kris Dollimore and Alan Lee Shaw, and bassist Jason "Moose" Harris. Shortly after the release of Not of This Earth in late 1995, Scabies left the Damned and Vanian reunited with Captain Sensible and his solo band – bassist Paul Gray, drummer Garrie Dreadful and keyboardist Monty Oxymoron.

Gray was replaced by Vanian's wife Patricia Morrison in time for a Japanese tour starting in September 1996, after he sustained an injury during a show. After three years of sustained touring, Dreadful was replaced in early 1999 by Spike Smith, who made way just a few months later for former English Dogs drummer Andrew "Pinch" Pinching. The group released their first studio album in six years, Grave Disorder, in 2001, before Morrison left the Damned after giving birth to daughter Emily on 9 February 2004. She was replaced by Stu West, a former bandmate of Pinch's in English Dogs. The addition of West began a long period of stability for the Damned, who released their tenth studio album So, Who's Paranoid? in 2008 and a series of live albums in subsequent years.

In September 2017, it was announced that Paul Gray had returned to the band for the upcoming album Evil Spirits and all future tour dates. Following the album's touring cycle, Pinch left in October 2019.

In early February 2022, The Damned announced their new drummer was Will Taylor and that they were working on a new studio album, set for release in late 2022.

Members

Current

Former

Touring

Timeline

Lineups

Bibliography

References

External links
The Damned official website

Damned, The